Heritage High School is the primary high school in the Saginaw Township Community Schools district. Heritage is located on North Center Road in Saginaw Charter Township, Michigan and is recognized as an Advanced Placement school.

History
Heritage was the product of a merger between Douglas MacArthur High School (which now houses White Pine Middle School) and Dwight D. Eisenhower High School (which now houses Heritage) in 1988, after Eisenhower High School was severely damaged in a 1987 arson.  Selecting one color from each of its parent schools, Heritage's official colors are Navy Blue and Kelly Green. Its nickname is "Hawks."

Academics

Heritage offers numerous Advanced Placement courses, and from the 2006–2007 school year to 2021, the school participated in the International Baccalaureate program.

Heritage also has an Academic Quiz Bowl team where students compete in local tournaments and then advance onto state tournaments.  Heritage also participates in the local Science Olympiad.

Demographics
The demographic breakdown of the 1,553 students enrolled in 2015-16 was:
 Male - 50.0%
 Female - 50.0%
 Native American/Alaskan - 0.3%
 Asian/Pacific islanders - 5.2%
 Black - 14.4%
 Hispanic - 10.6%
 White - 68.1%
 Multiracial - 1.4%

30.3% of the students were eligible for free or reduced-cost lunch.
The 2019 graduation rate was 93.4%.

Athletics
The Heritage High School Hawks compete in the Saginaw Valley League. The school colors are kelly green and navy blue. The following MHSAA sanctioned sports are offered:

 Baseball (boys)
 Basketball (girls and boys)
 Girls state championship - 2002, 2018, 2019
 Bowling (girls and boys)
 Competitive cheer (girls)
 Cross country (boys and girls)
 Football (boys)
 Golf (boys and girls)
 Ice hockey (boys)
 Lacrosse (boys and girls)
 Sideline Cheer
 Skiing (boys and girls)
 Soccer (boys and girls)
 Girls state championship - 2002
 Softball (girls)
 Swimming and diving (boys and girls)
 Tennis (boys and girls)
 Track and field (boys and girls)
 Boys state championship - 2001
 Volleyball (girls)
 Wrestling (boys)

Notable alumni

References

External links
 
 Saginaw Township Community Schools

Public high schools in Michigan
Educational institutions established in 1988
Schools in Saginaw County, Michigan
International Baccalaureate schools in Michigan
Saginaw Intermediate School District
1988 establishments in Michigan